WELD is an oldies and classic hits formatted broadcast radio station licensed to Fisher, West Virginia, serving the Potomac Highlands of West Virginia.  WELD is owned and operated by Thunder Associates, LLC.

History

By the 1950s, Richard Field Lewis Jr. (1907–1957) had added WELD (AM) to the Richard Field Lewis Jr. Stations (later Mid Atlantic Network Inc.).

References

External links
690 WELD Radio Online

ELD
Oldies radio stations in the United States
Classic hits radio stations in the United States